Mukunda Murari is a 2016 Indian Kannada-language devotional satirical comedy drama film directed by Nanda Kishore. The film stars Upendra in an atheist role and Sudeepa playing the role of Lord Krishna, teaming up for the first time. The film, a remake of Hindi film OMG - Oh My God! (2012), which in turn was based on a Gujarati stage play Kanji Virrudh Kanji, is produced by M.N. Kumar along with B. Jayashree Devi. The rest of the cast includes Nikita Thukral, Ishita Vyas, Kaavya Shah, P. Ravishankar, Avinash among others. The film has cinematography by Sudhakar S. Raj. The soundtrack and film score are composed by Arjun Janya.

The film released in over 250 screens on 28 October 2016 and ran for 50 days in theatres.

Plot
The film follows the story of an atheist, Mukunda, who sues God after losing his shop in an earthquake. Religious organizations revolt against him and Murari visits him as his human guide.

Atheist shopowner Mukunda (Upendra) talks about selling bulk statues of Hindu gods, and later tricks a devotee from Andhra Pradesh into buying a statue by claiming it is famous. The lack of respect, as his family sees it, makes his wife sad and she makes their son write the name of Rama for at least ten pages. After that, he criticises the practices of his son and wife. On the night of Krishna Janmashtami, he openly mocks a guru named Siddeshwara Swami Avinash who was encouraging his son and wife to walk on fire and pierce their tongues with a Trishula. However, after a dangerous earthquake in his market in Mysore, his antique shop was destroyed and had many financial liabilities. His in-law's family had separated his wife and son from him.

Cast

 Upendra as Mukunda
 Sudeepa as Murari / Krishna
 Nikita Thukral as Mukunda's wife
 Puddipeddi Sai Ravi Shankar as Leeladhara Swamy
 Devaraj as a retired advocate
 Prakash Belawadi as advocate
 Avinash as Siddeshwara Swami
 Malavika Avinash as TV interviewer 
 Ishita Vyas as Gopika Mathe
 Kaavya Shah as a news reporter 
 Tabla Nani as Mukunda's assistant
 Shivaram as Swamiji
 Kuri Prathap as Insurance Company Official
 Dingri Nagaraj
 Bullet Prakash
 K. S. Shridhar as priest
 Mohan Juneja
 Bhavana in a cameo appearance
 Rachita Ram in a cameo appearance
 Sathish Ninasam in a cameo appearance
 Mimicry Dayanand
 Vasu
 Swapna Raj
 Kuri Sunil
 Rockline Sudhakar

Production

Development
In January 2016, it was reported that director Nanda Kishore was under the preparation to remake the hit Bollywood film OMG - Oh My God! retaining the basic plot and giving it a native touch. Initially, the film was titled 'Kiccha!! Nee Begane Baaro', 'Brahma Vishnu', 'Sri Krishanrjuna Vijaya', 'Super Star Mattu Bigg Boss' and the makers roped in two of the biggest stars Upendra and Sudeepa to reprise the roles played by Paresh Rawal and Akshay Kumar respectively in the original version. Later the title was altered as the makers sound the earlier one was quite a common name. To bring the uniqueness to the title, it was renamed to Mukunda Murari.

Casting
After having roped in Upendra and Sudeepa to play the protagonist roles, the makers were on the search for the female lead and approached actress Prema hoping to bring her back to the screen after a long hiatus. Later Priyanka Upendra's name was also considered for this role. However, actress Nikita Thukral was finalized to play the wife role to Upendra. Further, actresses names such as Ramya Krishnan, Sadha and Nidhi Subbaiah were reported to play key supporting roles. Since none of these actresses were available, Ishita Vyas and Kaavya Shah were roped in to play those roles. The director went on to cast P. Ravi Shankar and Avinash to play other key roles.

Soundtrack

Arjun Janya has scored the soundtrack and score for the film. A total of four songs and one instrumental track were composed by him. The audio was officially released on 16 October 2016 through D Beats Music label.

Release
The film released in over 250 screens on 28 October 2016.

Box office
The film was released on the occasion of Deepavali. The film ran for 50 days in theaters.

Awards and nominations

IIFA Utsavam :-
 Best Villain Kannada (2016) - P. Ravishankar - Nominated
 Best Lyricist Kannada (2016) - V. Nagendra Prasad for the song "Neene Raama Neene Shyama" - Nominated

64th Filmfare Awards South :-
 Best Lyrics - Kannada (2016) - V. Nagendra Prasad for the song "Neene Raama Neene Shyama" - Nominated 
 Best Male Playback Singer – Kannada (2016) - Shankar Mahadevan for the song "Neene Raama Neene Shyama" - Nominated 

6th South Indian International Movie Awards :-
 Best Actress In A Supporting Role - Kannada (2016) - Kaavya Sha - Nominated (result pending)
 Best Actor In A Negative Role - Kannada (2016) - P. Ravishankar - Nominated (result pending)
 Best Lyricist - Kannada (2016) - V. Nagendra Prasad for the song "Neene Raama Neene Shyama" - Nominated (result pending)
 Best Music Director - Kannada (2016) - Arjun Janya - Nominated (result pending)

See also
 OMG - Oh My God!
 Gopala Gopala
 The Man Who Sued God
 Religious satire

References

External links
 

2010s Kannada-language films
2010s fantasy comedy-drama films
Indian satirical films
Films about lawsuits against God
Indian courtroom films
Indian fantasy comedy-drama films
Indian religious comedy films
Kannada remakes of Hindi films
Films scored by Arjun Janya
Films directed by Nanda Kishore
2016 comedy films
2016 drama films
Films about Krishna
Hinduism in popular culture
Films with atheism-related themes